Zoran Gajić (born 28 December 1958) is a Serbian volleyball coach serving as minister of sports since 2022. As a volleyball coach, he coached Rabita Baku, and FR Yugoslavia, Iran and Russia men's national volleyball teams.

From 1980 to 1988, Gajić was the head coach in the Volleyball training camp of the Serbian Province of Vojvodina and the head coach of the junior team of the Province of Vojvodina. From 1980 to 1983, he organised and supervised groups of young players aged 9 to 11.
As the head coach of the senior men’s national team of Yugoslavia, he claimed nine medals – including a historic Olympic gold at the Sydney 2000 Games, followed by a European Championship title a year later in Ostrava Czech Republic.
Born in Pančevo, his coaching career, he started in OK Mladost from Omoljica, then he coached OK Vojvodina, Aris Thessaloniki, A.C. Orestiada, Olympiacos S.C. Piraeus, A.E.K. Athens, Arçelik, Odintsovo, Ural Ufa.With the national volleyball team of FR Yugoslavia, he won a gold medal at the 2000 Summer Olympics and a bronze medal in 1996 at Atlanta. His other international victories include a silver medal in the 1998 World Championship and a gold medal in the 2001 European Championship. He won 3 more medals at the European Championships. In 2011 with Rabita Baku, for whom played 5 Serbian players won FIVB Women's Club World Championship in Doha, Qatar.
He was re-elected as president of the Volleyball Federation of Serbia in 2020 by the decision of 44 out of 50 delegates at the regular, electoral Assembly of the Volleyball Association of Serbia.

References

External links
 Gajić pravi izbor za selektora odbojkaša
 Trofej Gajiću u Azerbejdžanu 
 Rabita
 gold medal
 interview
 Nikola Grbić: Daj boze da budem ko Gajić
 Odbojkaški trener u poseti SSS: Gajić uvek drag gost 

1958 births
Living people
Sportspeople from Pančevo
Olympiacos S.C. coaches
Serbian volleyball coaches
Coaches of Russia men's national volleyball team
Independent politicians in Serbia
Government ministers of Serbia